Cynthia in the Wilderness is a 1916 British silent drama film directed by Harold Weston and starring Eve Balfour, Ben Webster and Milton Rosmer. It was based on a novel of the same name by Hubert Wales.

Cast
 Eve Balfour as Cynthia Elwes  
 Ben Webster as Laurence Cheyne  
 Milton Rosmer as Harvey Elwes  
 Mary Odette as Erica 
 Barbara Hannay

References

Bibliography
 Low, Rachael. History of the British Film, 1914-1918. Routledge, 2005.

External links

1916 films
1916 drama films
British silent feature films
British drama films
Films set in England
Films directed by Harold Weston
Films based on British novels
British black-and-white films
1910s English-language films
1910s British films
Silent drama films